Cyalithus is a genus of beetles in the family Buprestidae, containing the following species:

 Cyalithus cohici Descarpentries, 1948
 Cyalithus fouqueti (Bourgoin, 1925)
 Cyalithus fugifrons (Deyrolle, 1864)
 Cyalithus vitalisi (Bourgoin, 1922)

References

Buprestidae genera